TracenPoche (TeP) is a free interactive geometry software, written in Adobe Flash language. It is very light weight.

Features 

It is widely used in French secondary schools in the framework of the :fr:MathenPoche exerciser suite developed by the French association of mathematics teachers :fr:Sésamath.

External links
TracenPoche official website
Sésamath association
 TracenPoche belongs to the Inter2Geo European project aiming at interoperability between interactive geometry software.

Interactive geometry software